Nikolaos Manos (Greek: Νικόλαος Μάνος) was a significant Greek chieftain of the Macedonian Struggle.

Biography 
Manos was born in the late 19th century in Belkameni (now Drosopigi) of Florina. He acted as a messenger, guide and a soldier in various armed groups operating in the area of Florina, from April 1905 to November 1907. Following the suggestion of Nikolaos Andrianakis, he set up his own armed group and became its leader. His group gave many battles against Bulgarian komitadjis. He also assassinated a high-ranked Ottoman official in Neveska (now Nymfaio), Zenel Bey. He was arrested by the Ottoman authorities in April 1910 and imprisoned in Bodrum. He was released in the same year (even though he was sentenced to 10 years imprisonment), as Mehmed V gave amnesty to those who had been convicted for political crimes. He returned to his home town and continued his armed action. He assassinated Drosopigi's president, S. Mihalalezis as a pro-Romanian agent, spreading propaganda to Greek and Aromanian populations, as well as a partner of the Ottomans in many cases, expelling the Greeks of the village.

In 1912 Manos was forced to flee to Larisa. He returned to the region, with his own armed group during the First Balkan War. His team acted in the regions of Kastoria and Florina throughout the First Balkan War, fighting against the Ottoman troops. He also undertook several missions assigned to him by the 5th Infantry Division.

Sources 
 Αρχείο Διεύθυνσης Εφέδρων Πολεμιστών Αγωνιστών Θυμάτων Αναπήρων (ΔΕΠΑΘΑ), Αρχείο Μακεδονικού Αγώνα, φ. Μ-542
 John S. Koliopoulos (editor), Αφανείς, γηγενείς Μακεδονομάχοι, Εταιρεία Μακεδονικών Σπουδών, University Studio Press, Thessaloniki, 2008, p. 167-168

Greek people of the Macedonian Struggle
Greek Macedonians
Macedonian revolutionaries (Greek)
Prisoners and detainees of the Ottoman Empire
Greek military personnel of the Balkan Wars
People from Perasma
Greek people from the Ottoman Empire